Avon and Somerset Police is the territorial police force responsible for law enforcement in the county of Somerset and in four districts that used to be in the defunct county of Avon: Bristol, Bath and North East Somerset, North Somerset and South Gloucestershire.

, the force has 2,965 police officers, 299 special constables, and 330 police community support officers.

History

The police area covered by Avon & Somerset Police today can trace its policing heritage back to the very start of the modern policing system.  The Municipal Corporations Act 1835 created municipal boroughs across England and Wales, each with the power to create a borough police force.  Prior to this time 'policing' was largely unrecognisable from today's system with watchmen and parish constables providing variable levels of law enforcement, if any, driven largely by magistrates.  As a result of the Act the following borough police forces were created within the current Avon and Somerset Constabulary police area:  Bath City Police (1836), Bristol Constabulary (1836), Bridgwater Borough Police (1836), Wells City Police (1836), Glastonbury Borough Police, Chard Borough Police (1839), and Yeovil Borough Police (1854).

However, outside of the new boroughs there was no modern police.  Therefore, the government introduced the County Police Act 1839 which permitted county authorities to set up county forces to police areas outside of the boroughs.  Following these Acts, Gloucestershire Constabulary was created in 1839 which covered what is now the north part of the current police area of Avon & Somerset Constabulary (South Gloucestershire).  There was still some opposition to the new model of policing however, and rural Somerset had no police force until 1856.  The County and Borough Police Act 1856 mandated that county authorities must set up a constabulary.  Somerset Constabulary commenced policing the county in 1856 with Wells City Police and Glastonbury Borough Police merging into the new county force almost immediately, with Yeovil Borough Police following a year later.

Later in the 19th century the Local Government Act 1888 required that all boroughs with populations of less than 10,000 amalgamate their police force with the adjoining county constabulary.  This signalled the end of Chard Borough Police who merged into Somerset Constabulary on 1 April 1888. In 1940, Bridgwater Borough Police voluntarily became part of Somerset constabulary, the small force having a 101-year history, with the 20 officers of the borough police becoming Somerset County officers upon merger.

During the 20th century the number of individual police forces across the United Kingdom was reduced across the country on grounds of efficiency.  The Police Act 1964 gave the Home Secretary the power to enforce amalgamations but this was not required when Somerset Constabulary and Bath City Police voluntarily agreed to merge forming the Somerset and Bath Constabulary on 1 January 1967.  This resulted in 3 police forces left covering the geographic area which is now the responsibility of Avon & Somerset Constabulary; these being Somerset and Bath Constabulary, Bristol Constabulary and Gloucestershire Constabulary covering the extreme north.  This situation ended 7 years later on 1 April 1974 following the implementation the Local Government Act 1972 which created Avon and Somerset Constabulary following the amalgamation of Somerset and Bath Constabulary with Bristol Constabulary and the southern part of Gloucestershire Constabulary.

Proposed merger
In 2006, the Home Office announced plans to reduce the number of police forces in the UK from 42 to 24 in an attempt to save money. The plans were abandoned later that year due to lack of funding for the mergers, however the idea has resurfaced many times.
The proposed idea would see Avon and Somerset Constabulary merge with Gloucestershire Constabulary, Devon and Cornwall Police, Wiltshire Police and Dorset Police to form a 'super police force'.
The plans have been publicly criticised by all the involved forces, stating that it would lead to poor quality service and a reduction in local policing.

In February 2010, plans for a merger of the five South West police forces: Avon and Somerset, Wiltshire, Dorset, Gloucestershire and Devon and Cornwall were re-evaluated by the Home Office in a bid to reduce spending. All of the forces except Avon and Somerset were against an amalgamation. Following this Avon and Somerset Constabulary began purchasing uniform and equipment without the force crest. Instead identifying marks just read 'Police' without a force crest or reference to Avon and Somerset, the proposed merger to create a South Western Police Force has still not been ruled out as the Home Office and Central Government look to save funding.

Chief constables

Colin Port served as the chief constable since January 2005, however after the police and crime commissioner (PCC) Sue Mountstevens announced on 22 November 2012 that she would invite applications for the role rather than extending his contract, Port decided not to re-apply for the position and retired in March 2013. In January 2013, Port took the PCC to court to seek an injunction to block the interviews of candidates for the post of chief constable, however the case did not succeed.

Nick Gargan was appointed as the next chief constable in March 2013, however, just over a year later in mid-May 2014, Gargan was suspended by the PCC following allegations of 'inappropriate behaviour towards female officers and staff'. The enquiry into the allegations was referred to the Independent Police Complaints Commission (IPCC). Gargan is reported by the PCC to have denied the allegations.

During the first part of Gargan's suspension, the force was run by Deputy Chief Constable John Long. He stood down as acting chief constable at the end of August 2015, where he was replaced by Gareth Morgan who was serving as deputy chief constable for Long. Gargan resigned from the position in October 2015.

Morgan continued serving as acting chief constable after Gargan's resignation until the PCC appointed Andy Marsh, the former chief constable of the Hampshire Constabulary, as the new chief constable in February 2016.

In April 2021, Marsh announced that he would not be renewing his contract in July 2021. 
Following Marsh's departure, Deputy Chief Constable Sarah Crew took over as Temporary Chief Constable, and was confirmed in the role on 25 November 2021.

Officers killed in the line of duty

The Police Roll of Honour Trust and Police Memorial Trust list and commemorate all British police officers killed in the line of duty. Since its establishment in 1984, the Police Memorial Trust has erected 50 memorials nationally to some of those officers. Officers killed include:
 Superintendent William Balkwill (Somerset Constabulary), 1900: Fatally injured while restraining a violent prisoner
 DC Reginald Charles Grady (Bristol Constabulary), 1945: Collapsed and died during a violent arrest
 PC David George Petch, 1981, aged 31: Killed when his traffic patrol car crashed following a speeding car
 PC Peter Leonard Deans and PC Jonathan Michael Stapley, 1984: During a car chase their vehicle crashed and Deans and Stapley were fatally injured
 WPC Deborah Leat, 1986: During a car chase Leat's vehicle crashed and she was fatally injured
 PC Stephen Jones, 1999: Died after being hit by a stolen vehicle he was attempting to stop

Governance
The constabulary is overseen by the Avon and Somerset Police and Crime Commissioner, a new elected position which replaced the Avon and Somerset Police Authority in November 2012. The police and crime commissioner is scrutinised by the Avon and Somerset Police and Crime Panel, consisting of elected councillors from the police area. The first police and crime commissioner, who was elected on 15 November 2012 and took office on 21 November 2012, is Sue Mountstevens. She had previously been a magistrate and a member of the police authority, and had stood for election as an independent. 
Mountstevens was replaced by Mark Shelford, who was elected in May 2021.

Organisation

Avon and Somerset headquarters, which it has shared with Avon Fire and Rescue Service since 2017, is located in Portishead in North Somerset, close to the B3124. It was chosen as the site for the new HQ when the Bristol Constabulary's Bridewell Headquarters was deemed to be too small to continue serving as the force's HQ. The Portishead complex cost £31million to construct and was opened by Queen Elizabeth II on 2 June 1995.

In 2014, the force moved into three new police and custody centres in Bridgwater, Patchway and Keynsham. At that time they announced that a third of its other premises will be closed by 2019.

In 2017, Avon and Somerset moved away from geographical based policing model and to a directorate based one. The current directorates are:

 Response (Patrol, Communications and Detainee Investigations)
 Investigations and Operations Support (including Complex investigations, Criminal Justice and Intelligence)
 Neighbourhood and Partnerships (including Road Safety and Integrated Offender Management)
 Southwest regional Collaborations (Regional Organised Crime Unit (ROCU), Counter terrorism unit, Forensics)

Basic Command Unit structure

Each Basic Command Unit (BCU) has several specialist teams, namely:

 Neighbourhood Policing Teams, each with local beat managers and police community support officers. The teams concentrate on preventing and detecting local crime and targeting offenders, building contacts in the local community, resolving problems by working with local organisations and individuals and being visible and accessible.
 Targeted Patrol Teams responding to emergency calls.
 Traffic units patrol the roads and target and pursue people committing traffic offences, this includes Traffic Police Community Support Officers.
 Criminal Investigation Departments detect serious crime
 Forensic Services investigate crime scenes for forensic evidence that may correspond with many of the Home Office databases.
 Pro-active policing units target persistent criminals and focus on specific operations.
 Dog Units are officers who patrol with dogs and respond to incidents where a police dog is required.

Headquarters-based teams
To support the BCUs, several centralised teams operate from the Portishead headquarters:

 Senior Management
 Criminal Investigation Department
 Major Incident Planning
 Major Investigation Team
 Armed Response Group
 Counter Terrorism Group
 Emergency Communications Centre
 Force Contact Centre (SNEN)
 Intelligence
 Corporate communications

Cadets 
The force's cadets engage at public events, community engagements and meetings with their unit. There are nine cadet units  Bath, Bristol Central, Hartcliffe, Patchway, Portishead, Bridgwater, Southmead, Speedwell, and Weston-super-mare.

Operations

National Police Air Service 
The National Police Air Service (NPAS) is responsible for providing air support to all the police forces of England and Wales.  NPAS has a base within the force area adjacent to the Almondsbury M4/M5 Interchange. The helicopter serves all police forces within flying distance.

Road Policing Unit
In 2011 the RPU had 55 cars and 28 motorcycles. The unit has two bases: Almondsbury and Express Park, Bridgwater.

Support Group Unit
Avon and Somerset Police has a Support Group that specialise in specific needs of investigations or missions, such as police divers, football match management and explosive searching. The officers chosen for Support Group duties are physically elite and have passed extensive tests.

Mounted Division Unit

Although considered a luxury in other forces, Avon and Somerset Police have a division of mounted police due to the many events that attract large crowds in the area such as Badminton Horse Trials, Glastonbury Festival and Bristol City Football Club. The unit consists of 12 bred bay geldings. The unit is occasionally loaned to neighbouring forces as Avon and Somerset are the only West Country police force with a mounted division.

Former tri-force collaboration 
From 2013 to 2019, specialist teams – roads, firearms and police dogs – operated in collaboration with the Gloucestershire and Wiltshire forces.

Presentation

Headgear
Police officers on foot patrol wear the traditional custodian helmet, in the rose style, with a Brunswick star that reads 'Avon and Somerset Constabulary'. A peaked cap is worn on mobile patrol in vehicles, and a white peaked cap for traffic officers. Female officers have the additional option of a bowler hat, or a white bowler hat for traffic officers.

Uniform

When on duty, officers wear the black wicking shirt, covered with a black stab vest reading 'Police' on the front and back. Avon and Somerset no longer use the traditional NATO police jumper, having favoured the black fleece with 'Police' written on the chest and back. Avon and Somerset officers do not have Brunswick stars on their epaulettes, just the rank and/or collar number. Female officers do not wear the black and white chequered cravat.

Formal dress comprises an open-necked tunic, white shirt/blouse and tie. Constables and Sergeants wear custodian helmets and collar numbers on their epaulettes, while higher-ranked officers wear peaked caps, name badges and their rank on their epaulettes. The No.1 uniform is accompanied by black boots or shoes and occasionally black gloves, or brown gloves for the rank of Inspector and above.

Equipment

Avon and Somerset Constabulary use a variety of standard UK police equipment including TETRA digital radios, rigid handcuffs, PAVA spray and the ASP collapsible baton. Some officers also routinely carry the TASER Stun device designed to electrically shock a subject making them fall to the ground and to be subdued.

During late 2009 Avon and Somerset Constabulary introduced mobile data terminals and Personal Digital Assistants (PDA) to some of its operational vehicles and front line officers. This is steadily being rolled out across the force. Most front line officers now have their own PDA designed to assist the officer in his/her day to day tasks and allows them to spend more time out of the station.

Livery

The Avon and Somerset Constabulary uses the modern blue and yellow retro-reflective square Battenburg markings on all of its operational vehicles. This style of livery was introduced in 2005, when the traditional 'jam sandwich' style police markings were removed in favour of the new livery, thought to aid officers responding to emergency calls by allowing the public to quickly and clearly identify the vehicle as belonging to the police. The square livery also aids in the visibility of the force, which is perceived to enhance public confidence. Marked vehicles also show the force's Internet address on the rear and the word 'POLICE' across the bonnet. However, the force's crest is no longer used on most vehicles.

Strength and recruitment
, the force has 2,965 police officers, 299 special constables, and 330 police community support officers, 234 police support volunteers (PSV), and 2,803 staff.

A report has described Avon and Somerset Constabulary as at 'tipping point' due to financial pressure and increasing work load.  The region faces complex threats from Islamism, from right-wing extremists trying to incite anti Muslim hatred and from left-wing extremists.  The report states, "We now face a tipping point. We cannot sustain further funding cuts without extremely serious consequences." There is concern how far the force can protect its population from terrorism.  The report expresses concern over management of offenders and over increasing demands due to people with mental health problems. By May 2017, 1,926 registered sexual offenders were in the region. The constabulary manages over 11,000 offenders. Nearly 2,000 "high risk" people, including domestic abusers, violent offenders, sexual offenders, robbers and burglars are not under formal management.  Andy Marsh, then chief constable said, "Our continuing ability to safeguard communities, protect the vulnerable, and manage major incidents of this kind is being severely tested. It's simply not sustainable. There are serious choices to be made."

Performance

Complaints
For the year of 2007/8, the Independent Police Complaints Commission received 800 complaint cases, an increase of 18% from 2006/7, compared to a 0% increase nationally; from this number, 1,231 allegations were made, including 'Other neglect or failure in duty' and 'Incivility, Impoliteness and Intolerance', both at 6% and 3% respectively lower than the national average. Avon and Somerset Constabulary was second-lowest in its peer group of seven other forces.

Of the 1,231 allegations made, 40% were investigated - 8% higher than the national average - 41% were resolved locally, and 19% were withdrawn, dispensed with or discontinued. Of the 40% investigated, 12% were substantiated and 88% were unsubstantiated.

British Crime Survey
The British Crime Survey reported that 124,89 crimes were recorded in Avon and Somerset during 2009/10. Nationally recorded crime fell by 9% during this time, including a 22% fall in car crime, a 19% fall in fraud, a 13% fall for robbery and criminal damage. Assault and sex crimes rose by 1%, and 'Other Crimes', including public order offences, dangerous driving, possession of firearms, going equipped for stealing, and perverting the course of justice, rose by 26%.

In perceptions of police and crime, 65.2% of residents in Avon and Somerset believed that Avon and Somerset Constabulary was dealing with 'anti-social behaviour and crime that matters' in their area.

Official inspections
For the year of 2009/10, His Majesty's Inspectorate of Constabulary  (HMICFRS) rated Avon and Somerset Constabulary as 'Fair' in all categories, including 'Local Crime', 'Protection from harm' and 'Satisfaction and Confidence'. It was recorded as 'Good' in 'Reducing road death and injury', and 'Poor' in 'Comparative satisfaction of BME [black and minority ethnic] community'. In value for money, the force received 'Medium/High' status.

HMICFRS conducts a periodic police effectiveness, efficiency and legitimacy (PEEL) inspection of each police service's performance. In its latest PEEL inspection, Avon and Somerset Police was rated as follows:

Controversy

Race and sex discrimination in recruitment
In 2006, the force admitted it had contravened the Sex Discrimination Act and Race Relations Act when it deselected 186 white male candidates from its recruitment process solely because of their sex and race. Ralph Welsman, one of those discriminated against, sued the constabulary for their breach of employment laws and he received compensation in an out of court settlement. The policy was condemned by both the Police Federation and Commission for Racial Equality and it was abandoned. The same illegal policy was also used by Gloucestershire Constabulary.

Taser usage
In August 2015, officers from the Avon and Somerset force used a Taser on a disabled man, who had the mental age of a seven year old. The man was charged with assaulting an officer, but the case collapsed after defence lawyers provided CCTV of the alleged assault to prosecutors. The police watchdog said that the actions of the officer who failed to gather the CCTV evidence "fell below the standard expected", but concluded there was no wrongdoing. Campaigners and local politicians argued that the case represented “another incident of excessive and unnecessary” use of the weapon in Bristol. In response to the case, the force appointed a "dedicated lead for autism" and committed to ensuring that all new officers and civilian investigators undergo training covering "autism spectrum conditions and other non-visible disabilities".

In January 2017, the force referred itself to the Independent Police Complaints Commission following an incident when officers used a Taser on a black community activist who was trying to enter his own home. They mistook him for a wanted person as he persistently refused to give his name to the officers despite requests to do so. The incident was captured on video by a member of the public and by the officers' own body cameras.
In the subsequent criminal trial of the officer involved, they were acquitted of the allegation of assault and battery (assault by beating) at a trial at Salisbury Magistrates Court. The officer was also later cleared of misconduct by an independent disciplinary panel.

Death of James Herbert
The force has been strongly criticised over the death of James Herbert, who died aged 25 in police care. Herbert, who had mental health issues, was restrained and left wearing a winter coat alone in a hot police van during a 45-minute drive on a hot summer evening. At the police station, Herbert was unresponsive and was put naked into a police cell instead of being taken to hospital. Herbert went into cardiac arrest, and subsequently died. Deborah Coles of the charity Inquest said, "James was detained by the police for his safety. He should have been treated as a patient in need of medical care. Instead, he suffered a traumatic but entirely preventable death involving prolonged and brutal restraint." The police did not get mental health support for Herbert.  It is claimed Avon and Somerset police have improved their procedures since the Herbert incident, but other police forces continue with previous practise.

Bristol protests

In March 2021, a demonstration against the Police, Crime, Sentencing and Courts Bill splintered and a group of protestors headed toward Bridewell Police Station in Bristol City centre. The crowd began to attack police officers and the station where the windows of the station were broken and entry was attempted. Police repelled the mob and further damage to police vehicles was carried out including two vehicles that were destroyed by fire. This included a male who attempted to set a police van on fire whilst officers were inside the van 

Two further protests the following week were dispersed by police as they were all in contravention of Coronavirus legislation and the crowd refused to move on. The police received support from political leaders across the spectrum and a member of the public donated a gift to the police in recognition of their work. Other members of the public condemned the violence used by the police against protestors, and the lies told and repeated by the force Twitter account and the Chief Constable, Andy Marsh, regarding non-existent injuries to police officers.

See also
 List of law enforcement agencies in the United Kingdom, Crown Dependencies and British Overseas Territories
 Law enforcement in the United Kingdom
 reportMyloss.com

References

External links

 
 Avon and Somerset at HMICFRS

Organisations based in Somerset
Organisations based in Bristol
South Gloucestershire District
Bath and North East Somerset
North Somerset
Avon (county)
Organizations established in 1974
1974 establishments in England
Police forces of England